Raskifa (also Ras Kifa, R'asKifa) is a village located in the Zgharta District in the North Governorate of Lebanon. Its population is Maronite Catholic and Orthodox Christianity in Lebanon Greek Orthodox.

Gallery

References

External links
 Ras Kifa, Localiban 
Ehden Family Tree

Populated places in the North Governorate
Zgharta District
Maronite Christian communities in Lebanon
Eastern Orthodox Christian communities in Lebanon